The Wyoming Highway Patrol is the highway patrol and de facto state police agency for the U.S. state of Wyoming, and has jurisdiction across the entire state. The goals of the Wyoming Highway Patrol are to make Wyoming's highways safer by reducing the number of traffic crashes, deaths, and injuries; to apprehend and arrest criminals using Wyoming's highways; and to assist motorists in trouble. It is also tasked with providing security and transportation to the Governor of Wyoming.

History
The Wyoming Highway Patrol was created in 1933 to protect the lives, property and constitutional rights of all people in Wyoming. It was created after the Wyoming Department of Law Enforcement, whose sole duty was to enforce prohibition laws, disbanded. On May 23, 1933, the Highway Commission named Captain George Smith as the leader of the Wyoming Highway Patrol. Captain Smith, along with six other newly trained Patrolmen, left the state capital charged with the duty to “enforce the laws of the state relating to the registration and licensing of motor vehicles, the laws relating to use and operation of motor vehicles on highways, and all laws for the protection of the highways.”

As of June 2021, the Wyoming Highway Patrol has 208 troopers on patrol. In 2019, troopers investigated nearly 8,000 motor vehicle crashes across the state and removed over 1,300 intoxicated drivers from Wyoming roadways.

The current new sidearm for 2021 is the Sig Sauer P320 9MM 3.9 Inch Barrel XCarry Pro Series replacing the Glock Model 35 Gen 4 .40, which replaced the Smith & Wesson M&P .40.

Rank structure

Fallen officers
Since the establishment of the Wyoming Highway Patrol, two officers have died while on duty:

Patrolman Peter Visser (End of Watch October 12, 1981): Patrolman Peter Visser died as a result of the injuries sustained when his cruiser was rear-ended by a drunk driver.

Patrolman Chris S. Logsdon (End of Watch October 13, 1998): Patrolman Chris Logsdon was killed in a vehicle accident after being run off the road by another driver, a 92-year-old man who was confused and driving erratically.

See also

 List of law enforcement agencies in Wyoming
 State police
 State patrol
 Highway patrol

References

External links
 Wyoming Highway Patrol website

State law enforcement agencies of Wyoming
Government agencies established in 1933
1933 establishments in Wyoming